Cubilioides is a genus of beetle in the family Cerambycidae, Its sole species is Cubilioides singularis. It was described by Stephan von Breuning in 1940.

References

Pteropliini
Beetles described in 1940